The Yuen Chau Kok Public Library is a public library located within the Yuen Chau Kok Complex at 35 Ngan Shing Street, Sha Tin, Hong Kong. It is managed by the Leisure and Cultural Services Department (LCSD) and opened on March 30, 2017.

Gallery

References

Libraries established in 2017
Public libraries in Hong Kong
Sha Tin
2017 establishments in Hong Kong
Libraries in Hong Kong